Dichomeris thalamopa is a moth in the family Gelechiidae. It was described by Edward Meyrick in 1922. It is found in Amazonas, Brazil.

The forewings are glossy deep purple with a small orange mark surrounded with black towards the costa near the base and a slightly curved irregular black antemedian fascia edged on each side with orange-black-edged lines. The apical area is wholly blackish beyond an orange transverse line at four-fifths, making a strong rounded loop inwards in the disc, its costal edge whitish. The hindwings are dark fuscous.

References

Moths described in 1922
thalamopa